Staehelin or Stähelin is a surname. Notable people with the surname include:
Adolf Staehelin (1901–1965), Swiss chess player
Jenö Staehelin (born 1940), Swiss diplomat and lawyer
Lucas Andrew Staehelin (born 1939), Australian-born Swiss American cell biologist
Martin Staehelin (born 1937), Swiss musicologist

Stähelin
August Stähelin (1812–1886), Swiss politician
Felix Stähelin (1873–1952), Swiss historian
Hartmann F. Stähelin (1925–2011), Swiss pharmacologist
Helene Stähelin (1891–1970), Swiss mathematician
Johann Jakob Stähelin (1797–1875), Swiss theologian
Rudolf Stähelin (1875–1943), Swiss physician